Kurt Crain (December 31, 1964 – April 10, 2012) was an American football player and coach. He played college football for the University of Memphis and Auburn University. He went on to play two seasons in the NFL – one for the Houston Oilers, the other for the Green Bay Packers. In 2008, he joined the coaching staff of the University of South Alabama.

Crain died of an apparent self-inflicted gunshot wound at his home in Spanish Fort, Alabama on April 10, 2012. He was 47.

References

1964 births
2012 deaths
All-American college football players
American football linebackers
Auburn Tigers football players
Green Bay Packers players
Houston Oilers players
Memphis Tigers football players
People from Baldwin County, Alabama
Players of American football from Birmingham, Alabama
South Alabama Jaguars football coaches
Sportspeople from Birmingham, Alabama
Sportspeople from Mobile, Alabama
Suicides by firearm in Alabama
2012 suicides